R. hirta  may refer to:
 Rondeletia hirta, a plant species endemic to Jamaica
 Rudbeckia hirta, the black-eyed Susan, blackiehead, brown Betty, brown Daisy, brown-eyed Susan, a flowering plant species

Synonyms
 Rhus hirta, synonym for Rhus typhina, the staghorn sumac, a deciduous shrub to small tree species native to eastern North America

See also
 Hirta (disambiguation)